Linnville, Texas was a town in the Republic of Texas, in what is now Calhoun County.  It was founded in 1831 and destroyed in the Great Raid of 1840.

The raid in August 1840 by Penateka Comanches, led by war chief Buffalo Hump, on Victoria and the Port of Linnville, on Lavaca Bay, Texas, is said to be the largest raid by American Indians on cities in U.S. history (Texas was at the time still a republic). Linnville was sacked and burned by the Comanches, and the port was never rebuilt. Citizens of Linnville escaped to safety by taking to small boats and a schooner in the waters off the bay, watching as their town was burned to the ground.

The raid on Victoria and Linnville was one in a sequence of strikes and counter-strikes in Republic of Texas history that defined bitter relations between Comanches and Texans.

Events began with the Council House Fight in San Antonio, March 1840 in which Republic of Texas officials attempted to capture and take prisoner a large number of Comanche chiefs who had come to negotiate a peace treaty, killing them together with dozens of their family and followers. In revenge, the Comanche conducted the raid on Victoria and Linnville in August 1840. The Battle of Plum Creek, near Lockhart Texas, shortly after the raid on Linnville, was Texans' retaliation against Comanches in their retreat from Linnville. And finally, an expedition commanded by Colonel John Henry Moore against a Comanche village in October 1840, was revenge by Texans for the raid on Victoria and Linnville by striking Penateka Comanches in their homeland near what is now Colorado City.

References

Geography of Calhoun County, Texas
Former populated places in Texas
Ghost towns in South Texas